Wolf Lepenies (born 11 January 1941) is a German sociologist, political scientist, and author.

Biography
Lepenies was born near Allenstein, East Prussia (now Olsztyn, Poland), in 1945 his family fled from the Soviet Army's assault on East Prussia to Schleswig-Holstein and from there to North Rhine-Westfalia. He eventually grew up in Koblenz. He studied sociology and philosophy at the University of Münster in North Rhine-Westphalia and graduated with a promotion in 1967. In 1970 he habilitated at the Free University of Berlin. He traveled abroad, first to the Maison des sciences de l’homme in Paris, then to the Institute for Advanced Study in Princeton. In 1984 he joined the faculty of the Wissenschaftskolleg in Berlin before becoming a professor of sociology at the Free University of Berlin. He frequently returned to Princeton to conduct research. In 1986 he succeeded Peter Wapnewski as president of the Wissenschaftskolleg. In 2001 he was succeeded by Dieter Grimm. In 2006 he became a professor emeritus.

Lepenies is a member of the Royal Swedish Academy of Sciences.

Since 2004 he has been a member of the supervisory board of Axel Springer AG.

Selected Awards and honors
1984 - Gay-Lussac-Humboldt-Prize
1986 - Kulturpreis der Stadt Koblenz
1988 - Karl-Vossler-Preis
1998 - Leibniz Ring Hannover
1999 - Joseph Breitbach Prize
2000 - Theodor Heuss Prize
2003 - Leibniz Medal from the Berlin-Brandenburg Academy of Sciences
2003 - Prix Chartier, for Sainte-Beuve, au seuil de la modernité
2004 - Legion of Honour
2006 - Friedenspreis des Deutschen Buchhandels (awarded by Andrei Plesu)
2007 - Staatspreis des Landes Nordrhein-Westfalen
2010 - Schader Award
2015 - Adam-Mickiewicz-Preis
2016 - Kythera Prize
2017 - Order of the Star of Romania, Commander

Works
 Melancholie und Gesellschaft, 1969 (his 1967 doctoral dissertation)
 Orte des wilden Denkens. Zur Anthropologie von Claude Levi-Strauss (with Hans Henning Ritter), 1970
 Soziologische Anthropologie. Materialien, 1971
 Das Ende der Naturgeschichte. Wandel kultureller Selbstverständlichkeiten, 1976
 Geschichte der Soziologie (a history of sociology in four volumes), 1981
 Die drei Kulturen. Soziologie zwischen Literatur und Wissenschaft, 1985
 Autoren und Wissenschaftler im 18. Jahrhundert. Linné - Buffon - Winckelmann - Georg Forster - Erasmus Darwin, 1988
 Gefährliche Wahlverwandtschaften. Essays zur Wissenschaftsgeschichte, 1989
 Folgen einer unerhörten Begebenheit. Die Deutschen nach der Vereinigung, 1992
 Aufstieg und Fall der Intellektuellen in Europa, 1992
 Sainte-Beuve. Auf der Schwelle zur Moderne, 1997
 Benimm und Erkenntnis, 1997
 Sozialwissenschaft und sozialer Wandel. Ein Erfahrungsbericht, 1999
 Kultur und Politik. Deutsche Geschichten, 2006
 The Seduction of Culture in German History, 2006

References

External links

Zur Begründung für die Verleihung des Friedenspreises
Kuratoriumsmitglied des Digitalen Wörterbuchs der deutschen Sprache des 20. Jahrhunderts DWDS
 Thomas Meaney, Fancies and Fears of a Latin Europe, New Left Review, 107, September–October 2017
 Luca Corchia, Sull'opera Melanconia e società di Wolf Lepenies, in The Lab's Quarterly/Il Trimestrale del Laboratorio, 2, 2007, ss. 36 - 

1941 births
Living people
German sociologists
People from Olsztyn
Writers from Koblenz
People from East Prussia
Members of the Royal Swedish Academy of Sciences
Members of the Academy of Arts, Berlin
German male writers
Commanders of the Order of the Star of Romania